Rachel Specter is an American writer, producer and actress. She was a producer and writer of Crazy Ex-Girlfriend (2015–2019). She began her career as an actress but has since has written for the TV series like One Tree Hill and Cougar Town, and produced Hyperlinked (2017) and Indebted (2020).

Life and career 
Specter was born in Tampa, Florida. She graduated from the University of Florida, with honors. She played the role of Courtney in The House Bunny, and guest-starred in episodes of How I Met Your Mother, Gilmore Girls, What I Like About You, and Entourage. She has also appeared on Attack of the Show!, The Feed, and the web series Long Distance Relationship.

Before concentrating on behind the scenes work, Specter appeared as one of the actresses for the Sunsilk Color Showdown ad campaign. She was also known for a series of ads for RGX from Right Guard, Procter & Gamble's mid-2000s competitor against Axe, along with ads for Jack Link's Beef Jerky.

In 2018, Specter directed an episode of Crazy Ex-Girlfriend, alongside her longtime producing and writing partner Audrey Wauchope. However, due to a Directors Guild of America regulation regarding only established duos being granted directing credit, only Wauchope was able to be credited for the episode, and Wauchope and Rachel Bloom have taken up the cause for Specter to be credited equally for her direction.

Filmography 
 2007 American Family as Amy Foster – television series
 2007 My Sexiest Year as Sue Ryker
 2008 Prom Night as Taylor
 2008 The House Bunny as Courtney
 2009 Alone in the Dark II as Natalie
 2009 Deep in the Valley as Bambi Cummings

References

External links
 

Living people
American female models
American television actresses
Actresses from Tampa, Florida
University of Florida alumni
Female models from Florida
Writers from Tampa, Florida
American film actresses
21st-century American actresses
Year of birth missing (living people)